Coptodisca condaliae is a moth of the family Heliozelidae. It was described by August Busck in 1900. It is found in Florida.

References

Moths described in 1900
Heliozelidae